The Bernstorff Memorial (Danish: Bernstorffstøtten) is a memorial to Count Johann Hartwig Ernst von Bernstorff located at Lyngbyvej, just south of Kildegårds Plads, Gentofte Municipality, in Copenhagen, Denmark. It was erected by local farmers to a design by Johannes Wiedewelt to commemorate the agricultural reforms that Bernstorff introduced on his estate, Bernstorff Palace.

History

The memorial was inaugurated on a hilltop just south of Gentofte on 28 August 1783. The 100 years anniversary for the agricultural reforms at Bernstorff Palace was celebrated on 20 June 1866. It was listed in 1918.

Description
 
The Neoclassical memorial is executed in Norwegian marble and stands on a granite plinth. It features reliefs representing the harvest and a plaque inscription:

Æreminde efter Døden / for / Johan Hartvig Ernst / Greve af Bernstorff / som gav / udskiftede :::hovningsfrie arvelige /Gaarde / med dem Stræbsomhed Velstand alt / til Mønster for Efterslægten / :::MDCCLXVII / oprettet / af Godsets takfulde Beboere MDCCLXXXIII.

Publication
 Møller, N: Kort Beskrivelse over Forfatningen paa Godset Bernstorff for og efter Fælledskabets Ophævelse og Eiendoms Meddelelse, med Forklaring over den af Bønderne oprettede Obelisk, Copenhagen1783.

See also
 Liberty Column, Copenhagen

References

External links

 Unrealized project for the Bernstorff Memorial

Listed buildings and structures in Gentofte Municipality
Listed monuments and memorials in Copenhagen
Outdoor sculptures in Copenhagen
Obelisks in Denmark
Buildings and structures completed in 1886
Buildings and structures associated with the Bernstorff family